Westview (also known as the Burleson House) is a historic residence near Decatur, Alabama.  The plantation house was built in 1841 by Jonathan Burleson, a North Carolina native who settled in Huntsville as a child.  Burleson became a large land- and slaveowner in Morgan County.  One of his sons, Rufus Columbus Burleson, moved to Texas and was an early president of Baylor University.  Westview was the site of a Union Army camp during the Civil War.  After Burleson's death in 1866, much of his land was sold, but the 2,600 acres (1,050 ha) surrounding the house remained in the family.  The two-story clapboard structure has a double-height font portico with a second-story balcony.  The house has a central hall on each floor with two rooms on either side, and a kitchen wing off the southwest rear that was added around 1912.  The house was added to the National Register of Historic Places in 1982.

References

External links

National Register of Historic Places in Morgan County, Alabama
Houses on the National Register of Historic Places in Alabama
Houses completed in 1841
Houses in Morgan County, Alabama
Plantation houses in Alabama